The power station Berlin-Wilmersdorf was a power plant in Berlin-Schmargendorf, which went into service in 1977, and has been shut down in 2021.

Construction of the facility, which belongs to the BEWAG, started in 1973.

At the time of construction, the three power engines are MS9001B gas turbines, manufactured in Belfort (France) by a cooperation between Alsthom and General Electric.

It has three blocks with a power of 110 megawatts, each equipped with a  chimney.  This very striking facility received an architectural prize in the 1980s.  It is not located nearby a river and therefore must take its cooling water from underground. There was an explosion on January 2, 1992, in one of the blocks. It is run by Vattenfall Europe, a subdivision of Vattenfall.

References 

Natural gas-fired power stations in Germany
Economy of Berlin
Buildings and structures in Berlin
Buildings and structures completed in 1977